Lake County Schools is a public school district located in Lake County, Florida, U.S.. The district operates 59 schools, including 20 elementary schools, 8 middle schools, and 9 high schools. The district educates over 41,100 students in pre-kindergarten through twelfth grade.

As of 2017, the superintendent is Diane Kornegay, M.Ed.

Elementary schools
 Astatula Elementary
 Beverly Shores Elementary
 Clermont Elementary 
 Cypress Ridge Elementary
 Eustis Elementary
 Eustis Heights Elementary
 Fruitland Park Elementary
 Grassy Lake Elementary
 Groveland Elementary
 Leesburg Elementary
 Lost Lake Elementary
 Pine Ridge Elementary
 Rimes Early Learning Center (Pre-K - 2nd grade)
 Sawgrass Bay Elementary
 Seminole Springs Elementary
 Sorrento Elementary
 Tavares Elementary
 Treadway Elementary
 Triangle Elementary
 Umatilla Elementary
 Villages Elementary

Middle schools 
 Carver Middle
 East Ridge Middle
 Eustis Middle
 Cecil E. Gray Middle
 Mount Dora Middle
 Oak Park Middle
 Tavares Middle
 Umatilla Middle
 Windy Hill Middle

High schools
 East Ridge High (Knights)
 Eustis High (Panthers) 
 Eustis High (Curtright Campus)
 Lake Minneola High (Hawks)
 Leesburg High (Yellow Jackets)
 Mount Dora High (Hurricanes)
 South Lake High (Eagles)
 Tavares High (Bulldogs)
 Umatilla High (Bulldogs)

Conversion charters 
 Mascotte Elementary  
 Minneola Elementary   
 Round Lake Charter  
 Lake Technical College
 Spring Creek Elementary

Charter schools 
 Alee Academy
 Altoona School
 Milestones Charter School
 Imagine South Lake Charter

Other Schools 
 Lake County Virtual School
 Lake Hills School
 Lake Success Academy

References

External links 
Lake County Schools Website
Project Student Safety

Education in Lake County, Florida
School districts in Florida